Firle Hill Climb is a disused hillclimbing course near Lewes, East Sussex, England, sometimes referred to as Bo Peep Hill Climb. The event was celebrated on 20 September 2015 by the Bo Peep Drivers Club.

In 1966 The Autocar reported: "
The hill covers 600 yards, and if the weather is fine the setting is really superb."

History
The situation faced by the racing motorist in England after World War Two was bleak. Brooklands was permanently closed and Donington Park was out of action. Two other obstacles were petrol rationing, which was not abolished until 26 May 1950, and an acute shortage of tyres, the R.A.C. having banned retreaded or remoulded tyres from competition. The search was on for a place to race. The Bentley Drivers' Club found Firle. W.O. Bentley attended the race here in 1951.

The BARC event held on Sunday 2 June 1957, was run in conjunction with the BARC 11th Annual Rally at Eastbourne, a 50-mile road event held the day before, starting at the Grasshopper Inn near Westerham, with intermittent driving tests, including one at Butts Hill, Willingdon, and then on to Eastbourne, via Beachy Head. A steward of the rally was Captain A. Frazer-Nash, M.I.Mech.E.

On 14 September 1958 Tony Marsh set an unofficial record of 25.31 sec during a demonstration run: "He chose to run in the big twin Cooper rather than the Formula 2 car, the former being less of a handful on Firle's somewhat bumpy surface."

A report from 1965 states:
"Once again, many of the hill records were lowered, including the absolute record for the hill, which came down from 24.45 seconds, set up by Miss Patsy Burt in 1963, to 23.87 seconds standing to Gordon Parker in a Cooper Climax. Patsy Burt did her utmost to retain her title but was unable to better 23.97."

On 12 September 1965, Jack Sears driving a Bentley 8-litre set fastest time of the day by a Bentley.

David Good, BRM, set the track record of 22.78 sec on 28 May 1967, a record he holds in perpetuity, as the course closed at the end of the season.

Firle Hill Climb events and past winners

Key: R = Course Record; S/C = Supercharged.

See also
 Brighton Speed Trials
 Goodwood Circuit
 Gurston Down Motorsport Hillclimb
 Lewes Speed Trials

Footnotes

Hillclimbs
Defunct sports venues in East Sussex
Defunct motorsport venues in England
Hill Climb